Olaf van Andel (born 22 March 1984 in Tilburg) is a rower from the Netherlands.

Van Andel took part in the World Championships of 2007 in Munich becoming fifth in the coxed fours. He qualified for the 2008 Summer Olympics in Beijing with the Dutch eights forming a team with Rogier Blink, Jozef Klaassen, Meindert Klem, David Kuiper, Diederik Simon, Olivier Siegelaar, Mitchel Steenman and cox Peter Wiersum. Due to an injury Siegelaar was replaced by Reinder Lubbers during the tournament.

References

1984 births
Living people
Dutch male rowers
Rowers at the 2008 Summer Olympics
Olympic rowers of the Netherlands
Sportspeople from Enschede